Amphicyclotus is a genus of tropical land snails with gills and an operculum, terrestrial gastropod mollusks in the superfamily Cyclophoridae (according to the taxonomy of the Gastropoda by Bouchet & Rocroi, 2005).

Amphicyclotus is the type genus of the subfamily Neocyclotidae.

Species
Species within the genus Amphicyclotus include:

See also 
 Amphicyclotulus is a different genus in the same family Neocyclotidae.

References

Further reading 
 

Neocyclotidae
Taxonomy articles created by Polbot

pt:Amphicyclotulus